Ryan Finley may refer to:
Ryan Finley (soccer) (born 1991), American soccer player
Ryan Finley (businessman), American businessperson and the founder of SurveyMonkey
Ryan Finley (American football) (born 1994), American football quarterback